The 102nd New York State Legislature, consisting of the New York State Senate and the New York State Assembly, met from January 7 to May 22, 1879, during the third year of Lucius Robinson's governorship, in Albany.

Background
Under the provisions of the New York Constitution of 1846, 32 Senators and 128 assemblymen were elected in single-seat districts; senators for a two-year term, assemblymen for a one-year term. The senatorial districts were made up of entire counties, except New York County (five districts) and Kings County (two districts). The Assembly districts were made up of entire towns, or city wards, forming a contiguous area, all within the same county.

At this time there were two major political parties: the Republican Party and the Democratic Party. The Prohibition Party and the Greenback Party also nominated tickets.

Elections
The New York state election, 1878 was held on November 5. The only statewide elective office up for election was carried by a Republican. The approximate party strength at this election, as expressed by the vote for Judge of the Court of Appeals, was: Republican 391,000; Democratic 356,000; Greenback 75,000; and Prohibition 4,000.

Sessions
The Legislature met for the regular session at the State Capitol in Albany on January 7, 1879; and adjourned on May 22.

On January 7, senators and assemblymen met at the Old Capitol and then marched together to the New Capitol, taking officially possession of the new accommodations. The New Capitol was then still under construction, being finished only in 1899; and the Senate met for the time being in the Court of Appeals chamber. Due to heavy snowfall, many members had not arrived yet from the Western parts of the State, and the Legislature adjourned.

On January 9, Thomas G. Alvord (R) was again elected Speaker, with 94 votes against 24 for Erastus Brooks (D).

On January 21, the Legislature re-elected U.S. Senator Roscoe Conkling (R) to a third six-year term, beginning on March 4, 1879.

On April 23, the Legislature re-apportioned the Senate districts; and the Assembly seats per county. Columbia, Delaware, Madison, Oneida, Ontario and Oswego counties lost one seat each; Kings and New York counties gained three seats each.

State Senate

Districts

 1st District: Queens, Richmond and Suffolk counties
 2nd District: 1st, 2nd, 3rd, 4th, 5th, 7th, 11th, 13th, 15th, 19th and 20th wards of the City of Brooklyn
 3rd District: 6th, 8th, 9th, 10th, 12th, 14th, 16th, 17th and 18th wards of the City of Brooklyn; and all towns in Kings County
 4th District: 1st, 2nd, 3rd, 4th, 5th, 6th, 7th, 13th and 14th wards of New York City
 5th District: 8th, 9th, 15th and 16th wards of New York City
 6th District: 10th, 11th and 17th wards of New York City
 7th District: 18th, 20th and 21st wards of New York City
 8th District: 12th, 19th and 22nd wards of New York City
 9th District: Putnam, Rockland and Westchester counties
 10th District: Orange and Sullivan counties
 11th District: Columbia and Dutchess counties
 12th District: Rensselaer and Washington counties
 13th District: Albany County
 14th District: Greene and Ulster counties
 15th District: Fulton, Hamilton, Montgomery, Saratoga and Schenectady counties
 16th District: Clinton, Essex and Warren counties
 17th District: Franklin and St. Lawrence counties
 18th District: Jefferson and Lewis counties
 19th District: Oneida County
 20th District: Herkimer and Otsego counties
 21st District: Madison and Oswego counties
 22nd District: Onondaga and Cortland counties
 23rd District: Chenango, Delaware and Schoharie counties
 24th District: Broome, Tompkins and Tioga counties
 25th District: Cayuga and Wayne counties
 26th District: Ontario, Seneca and Yates counties
 27th District: Chemung, Schuyler and Steuben counties
 28th District: Monroe County
 29th District: Genesee, Niagara and Orleans counties
 30th District: Allegany, Livingston and Wyoming counties
 31st District: Erie County
 32nd District: Cattaraugus and Chautauqua counties

Note: There are now 62 counties in the State of New York. The counties which are not mentioned in this list had not yet been established, or sufficiently organized, the area being included in one or more of the abovementioned counties.

Members
The asterisk (*) denotes members of the previous Legislature who continued in office as members of this Legislature.

Employees
 Clerk: John W. Vrooman
 Sergeant-at-Arms: Weidman Dominick
 Doorkeeper: James G. Caw
 Stenographer: Hudson C. Tanner

State Assembly

Assemblymen
The asterisk (*) denotes members of the previous Legislature who continued as members of this Legislature.

Employees
 Clerk: Edward M. Johnson
 Sergeant-at-Arms: Charles A. Orr
 Doorkeeper: Henry Wheeler
 First Assistant Doorkeeper: Harrison Clark
 Second Assistant Doorkeeper: Michael Maher
Assistant Doorkeeper: John Christie
 Stenographer: Worden E. Payne

Notes

Sources
 Civil List and Constitutional History of the Colony and State of New York compiled by Edgar Albert Werner (1884; see pg. 276 for Senate districts; pg. 291 for senators; pg. 298–304 for Assembly districts; and pg. 378 for assemblymen)
 The State Government for 1879 by Charles G. Shanks (Weed, Parsons & Co, Albany, 1879)
 THE CANVASS FOR SPEAKER in NYT on January 6, 1879
 THE STRUGGLE AT ALBANY in NYT on January 7, 1879
 THE CONTEST FOR SPEAKER in NYT on January 8, 1879
 ALVORD CHOSEN SPEAKER in NYT on January 9, 1879
 WORK BEGUN AT ALBANY in NYT on January 10, 1879

102
1879 in New York (state)
1879 U.S. legislative sessions